Mitra Bola Utama Sidoarjo Football Club (simply known as Mitra Bola Utama or MBU) is an Indonesian football club based in Sidoarjo Regency, East Java. They currently compete in the Liga 3. In 2011, the club won the Liga Indonesia Third Division and got promoted to the Second Division.

Honours
 Liga Indonesia Third Division
 Champions: 2010–11

References

Football clubs in Indonesia
Football clubs in East Java